The Image Makers is a 2000 Swedish television play directed by Ingmar Bergman and written by Per Olov Enquist. The drama is set in the year 1920 at Filmstaden where the film director Victor Sjöström is shooting the film The Phantom Carriage, an adaptation of Selma Lagerlöf's novel Thy Soul Shall Bear Witness! Accompanied by actress Tora Teje and film photographer Julius Jaenzon, he has now invited the book's author to take a first look at some early scenes.

The play was originally written for and staged by the Royal Dramatic Theatre, featuring the same cast, where it premiered on 13 February 1998, directed by Bergman. Following the success of the stage production, it was adapted for Swedish television by SVT in 2000 with Bergman as director. It appeared on a UK DVD (Tartan Video, 2008) along with The Phantom Carriage.

Cast
Anita Björk as Selma Lagerlöf
Elin Klinga as Tora Teje
Lennart Hjulström as Victor Sjöström
Carl Magnus Dellow as Julius Jaenzon
Henrik Nyberg as projectionist

References

External links

2000 television films
2000 films
Films directed by Ingmar Bergman
Films set in 1920
Selma Lagerlöf
2000s Swedish-language films
Swedish television films
Films about Nobel laureates
2000s Swedish films